Tribes Hill is a census-designated place (CDP) located in the Towns of Mohawk (80%) and Amsterdam (20%) in Montgomery County, New York, United States. The population was 1,003 at the 2010 census. One theory is the name is based on this location having been a gathering spot for the Mohawk nation, the dominant Iroquois tribe in the area during colonial times.  People who live here are referred to as “Tribes Hillbillies”.  

Tribes Hill spans the border of the Town of Mohawk and Town of Amsterdam, approximately five  miles west of the City of Amsterdam on Route 5.

Geography
Tribes Hill is located at  (42.952392, -74.290590).

The community is north of the Mohawk River.

Demographics

As of the census of 2000, there were 1,024 people, 417 households, and 303 families residing in the CDP. The population density was 449.3 per square mile (173.4/km2). There were 436 housing units at an average density of 191.3/sq mi (73.8/km2). The racial makeup of the CDP was 96.78% White, 0.78% African American, 0.78% Native American, 0.68% Asian, 0.10% from other races, and 0.88% from two or more races. Hispanic or Latino of any race were 0.88% of the population.

There were 417 households, out of which 27.3% had children under the age of 18 living with them, 58.0% were married couples living together, 10.8% had a female householder with no husband present, and 27.3% were non-families. 24.7% of all households were made up of individuals, and 11.8% had someone living alone who was 65 years of age or older. The average household size was 2.46 and the average family size was 2.89.

In the CDP, the population was spread out, with 21.9% under the age of 18, 5.9% from 18 to 24, 23.1% from 25 to 44, 29.1% from 45 to 64, and 20.0% who were 65 years of age or older. The median age was 44 years. For every 100 females, there were 89.6 males. For every 100 females age 18 and over, there were 87.4 males.

The median income for a household in the CDP was $36,587, and the median income for a family was $39,750. Males had a median income of $35,000 versus $26,875 for females. The per capita income for the CDP was $19,390. About 5.8% of families and 7.4% of the population were below the poverty line, including 10.6% of those under age 18 and 11.7% of those age 65 or over.

References

External links

Census-designated places in New York (state)
Census-designated places in Montgomery County, New York
Populated places on the Mohawk River